Wolfgang Thimmig (4 October 1912 – 6 November 1976) was a German Luftwaffe night fighter ace during World War II. By the end of the war he had achieved 24 aerial victories, reached the rank of Oberstleutnant, and was Geschwaderkommodore for NJG 2, having previously been the Kommodore for NJG 4.

In 1956, Thimmig joined the newly formed Bundesluftwaffe and was the Military Attache of the Federal Republic of Germany in Sweden between 1959 and 1963. In addition to that, he was the Nigerian Air Force's Chief of the Air Staff from 1965 to 1966. He was the second Commander of the Nigerian Air Force (NAF), and given the task of continuing the creation of an air force for Nigeria under a 1963 agreement between Nigeria and Germany. Thimmig and the German Air Force Assistance Group (GAFAG) withdrew from Nigeria in January 1966, when their mission of creating the air force was completed.

Summary of career

Aerial victory claims
Foreman, Parry and Mathews, authors of Luftwaffe Night Fighter Claims 1939 – 1945, researched the German Federal Archives and found records for 23 nocturnal victory claims. Matthews and Foreman also published Luftwaffe Aces — Biographies and Victory Claims, listing Thimmig with 23 claims, all of which claimed in Defense of the Reich.

Awards
 Honor Goblet of the Luftwaffe on 28 September 1942 as Hauptmann and Gruppenkommandeur
 German Cross in Gold on 12 July 1944 as Hauptmann in the III./Nachtjagdgeschwader 1

Notes

References

Citations

Bibliography

 
 
 
 

Nigerian Air Force officers
German World War II flying aces
1912 births
1976 deaths
German Air Force personnel
Recipients of the Gold German Cross
German military attachés
German expatriates in Nigeria
German expatriates in Sweden